Andy Capp's is an American brand of flavored corn and potato snack made to look like French fries. The product was created in 1971 by Goodmark Foods, Inc., which licensed the name and likeness of the comic strip character Andy Capp from Publishers-Hall Syndicate.  Until recent years the strip was featured on the back of packages. In 1998 Goodmark Foods was acquired by ConAgra Foods, which manufactures and distributes the product to this day.

Packages in six flavors: Hot Fries, Ranch Fries, Cheddar Fries, BBQ Fries, Beer Battered Onion Rings and Beer Battered Onion Rings: Hot, the last of which are shaped like onion rings as opposed to fries, and are now hot. Hot Fries were the first popular flavor in this line of snack foods. On the back of some packages, Zesty Ranch was listed as one of the flavors, and was distributed to schools for snack purchases. The Pub Fries, Salsa, Hot Chili Cheese Steak, and White Cheddar Steak Fries flavors have all been discontinued.

The BBQ Fries, after being discontinued, resurfaced in 2011 in a new bag design made to match the current Hot Fries flavors.

List of flavors 
 Pub Fries (discontinued) 
 Hot Fries
 Hot Chili Cheese Steak Fries (discontinued)
 Salsa Fries (discontinued)
 Cheddar Fries
 Cheddar and Bacon Fries (Mid-west & Southeastern U.S. only)
 White Cheddar Steak Fries (discontinued)
 Ranch Fries 
 BBQ Fries
 Beer Battered Onion Rings
 Beer Battered Onion Rings: Hot

References

Products introduced in 1971
Brand name snack foods
Conagra Brands brands
Food advertising characters
Male characters in advertising
Mascots introduced in 1957